is a Japanese tennis player.

Tajima has a career high ATP singles ranking of 603 achieved on 20 January 2021.

Tajima won the 2018 French Open – Boys' doubles title.

ATP Challenger and ITF Futures finals

Singles: 2 (0–2)

Doubles: 11 (5–6)

Junior Grand Slam finals

Doubles: 1 (1 title)

External links
 
 
Official site: https://naokitajima.tennis/

2000 births
Living people
Japanese male tennis players
People from Kumamoto
French Open junior champions
Tennis players at the 2018 Summer Youth Olympics
Grand Slam (tennis) champions in boys' doubles
Youth Olympic gold medalists for Japan
21st-century Japanese people